The flasher scorpionfish ( Scorpaenopsis macrochir),  or rough humpback scorpionfish is a species of venomous marine ray-finned fish belonging to the family Scorpaenidae, the scorpionfishes. This species is found in the western Pacific Ocean.

Taxonomy
The flasher scorpionfish was first formally described in 1910 by the Australian ichthyologist James Douglas Ogilby with the type locality given as Bulwer Island near Brisbane. The specific name macrpocheir means "large hand", a reference to the large pectoral fins.

Description
The flasher scorpionfish has a broad, spiny head with a wide space between the eyes, a highly arched back, and a divided upper opercular spine. It has 12 spines in its dorsal fin and nine soft rays and the anal fin has three spines and five soft rays. The large pectoral fin is flushed with yellow and orange on its inside and has a complete, broad black band near its margin and no large back spots. This fish is one of five very similar species of humpback scorpionfish and can be distinguished from  S. diabolus, S. gibbosa, and S. obtusa by the markings on the inside of the pectoral fin. From S. neglecta it can also be differentiated by the presence of two to six points on the nasal spine. This species attains a maximum total length of

Distribution and habitat
It is indigenous to the tropical and subtropical waters of western and northwest Australia, the Moluccas, and the Philippines to the Marquesas and Society Islands, north to Ryukyu Islands, south to Rowley Shoals, Tonga, and the Mariana and Caroline Islands in Micronesia. S. macrochir is typically found on soft substrates, where it sometimes buries itself, camouflaged among rubble where it lies in wait for passing prey.

Biology
The flasher scorpionfish is either found as a solitary fish or in pairs. They are nocturnal ambush predators that are camouflaged among the coral rubble, as well as partially burying them selves in the substrate. Here they wait for prey such as small fishes to come within range and be engulfed in the large mouth. They have grooves along their fin spines which contain venom glands.

Utilisation
The flasher scorpionfish is rare in the aquarium trade.

See also 

 List of marine aquarium fish species

References

 
 

flasher scorpionfish
Taxa named by James Douglas Ogilby
Fish described in 1910